"The One at the Beach" is the twenty-fifth and final episode of Friends third season. It first aired on the NBC network in the United States on May 15, 1997.

Plot
At the beginning of the episode, Rachel gets upset when Bonnie – Ross's new girlfriend – starts listing all the places she's had sex. Phoebe comes in with some news: She found an old picture of her parents with a friend – also named Phoebe Abbott, who lives on the beach in Montauk; Phoebe suggests the gang spend the weekend there so she can search for her father. Rachel is pleased to learn that Bonnie has to work and is therefore unable to attend. While waiting for Phoebe to come pick them up, Monica spots a couple walking arm in arm, and wonders if she will ever find a boyfriend again. Chandler says that if "worse comes to worst" he will gladly assume the boyfriend role – a prospect Monica finds hilarious. He then spends the rest of the episode trying to prove to Monica that he is good "boyfriend material".

Phoebe pulls up in the cab – and with the news that one of her massage clients is letting them use his beach house for the weekend. They pull up to the beach house and discover it is raining and that the house has suffered some flood damage and is filled with sand. Phoebe then visits the older Phoebe, who is a realtor. Younger Phoebe wants to know everything about her parents, but older Phoebe says she unfortunately lost touch with Frank and Lily after high school. She has a suspicion that older Phoebe is lying about not knowing Frank's whereabouts, and steals a picture from the refrigerator. When older Phoebe cancels their dinner plans the next night, claiming to be out of town, Phoebe breaks into her house. The older Phoebe catches her, and tells her the truth: Not only does she really not know where Frank is but she is younger Phoebe's real mother.

While Joey tries to get the gang to play strip poker to distract them from the rain, Rachel tries to paint Ross' toenails; they playfully wrestle for a bit. The gang finally decides to give in and play Strip Poker, but they cannot find any cards – so they end up playing Strip Happy Days Game and strip Joey completely naked. While Monica and Rachel talk about the fact that Rachel is flirting with Ross, Rachel gets upset when Bonnie shows up and joins in the game.

The next morning, Joey wakes up to find that the gang has buried him in the sand – and built a mermaid out of sand around him, complete with large breasts. Ross and Bonnie come down together, much to Rachel's dismay. She ends up getting her revenge, though – by convincing once-bald Bonnie to shave her head again. Ross is upset, especially when he learns it was Rachel's idea. He fights with Rachel and points out it was Rachel who ended their relationship. Rachel then says that she was just mad at him – and she had never fallen out of love with him. When Ross asks if she wants to get back together, she replies that she does not know; she still cannot forgive him for what he did but feels something when she is with him, and they kiss. A talk with Joey and Chandler does not help Ross since he is still in love with Rachel; but he also really likes Bonnie and thinks it would be healthy to move on. The episode – and the third season – ends with Ross upstairs in the hallway. To one side is Rachel's bedroom; the other, his and Bonnie's room. He thinks for a moment, then picks a door and goes in, saying "Hi" to someone there.

During the closing credits, Chandler persists in trying to prove he would be good boyfriend material by knocking on the front door and pretending to be a guy picking her up for a date. On his final attempt, he plays the part as Tim Conway's dwarf character, Dorf, resulting in Monica storming off to bed.

Reception
In the original broadcast, the episode was viewed by 28.8 million viewers.
Sam Ashurst from Digital Spy ranked it #157 on their ranking of the 236 Friends episodes.
Telegraph & Argus also ranked it #157 on their ranking of all 236 Friends episodes.

References

1997 American television episodes
Friends (season 3) episodes